The Long March 6A or Chang Zheng 6A as in pinyin, abbreviated LM 6A for export or CZ 6A within China, is a Chinese launch vehicle of the Long March family, which was developed by the China Aerospace Science and Technology Corporation (CASC)  and the Shanghai Academy of Spaceflight Technology (SAST). The vehicle is a further development of the Long March 6, with 2 YF-100 engines on the first stage as opposed to 1 on the Long March 6, augmented by 4 solid rocket boosters. The Long March 6A is China's first rocket with solid rocket boosters. The maiden launch of the Long March 6A took place 29 March 2022, successfully reaching orbit. It was also the first launch from the newly built launch complex 9A in Taiyuan.

Launch Statistics

List of launches

Mishaps
After the release of the Yunhai 3 following the Y2 launch of 11 November 2022, the rocket's upper stage exploded and broke into more than 50 pieces of debris.

See also 

 Comparison of orbital launchers families
 Comparison of orbital launch systems

References 

Long March (rocket family)
2022 in China
Vehicles introduced in 2022
Spacecraft that broke apart in space